The Brazilian Air Force (FAB) is the air branch of the Brazilian Armed Forces and one of the three national uniformed services.  The FAB was formed when the Army and Navy air branches were merged into a single military force initially called "National Air Forces" in 1941. Both air branches transferred their equipments, installations and personnel to the new force.

According to Flight International (Flightglobal.com) and the International Institute for Strategic Studies, the Brazilian Air Force has an active strength of 80,937 military personnel and operates around 715 aircraft. The Brazilian Air Force is the largest air force in the Southern Hemisphere and the second largest in the Americas after the United States Air Force.

History

Contestado Campaign
The Contestado War was the first conflict in which Brazilian military aviation was employed. On September 19, 1914, taking advantage of a special train driving troops, three aircraft were boarded: a Morane-Saulnier biplane, a Morane-Saulnier monoplane and a Blitzer SIT biplane.  The train continued from Rio de Janeiro passing through São Paulo where it would reach the São Paulo – Rio Grande railway to the station of União da Vitória.

Along the way, sparks shot through the locomotive, hitting a gallon of gasoline in one of the wagons carrying the dismantled aircraft. The fire spread, much like the planes. After the crash, only the Morane-Saulnier remained in flying condition.

In the conflict zone, he coordinated the construction of runways and hangars to be used in União da Vitória, Canoinhas and Rio Negro. Then, two Morane-Saulnier and special ammunition were brought from Rio de Janeiro, as well as a mechanic.

The first aerial activity occurred only on January 4, 1915, when a training flight followed the course of the Iguaçú River to the Timbo River. The first official mission took place on January 19 and the duration of the flight was just over an hour.

The following week, on February 25, 1915, a Morane-Saulnier had an accident. During a test flight in the vicinity of the field, the engine stopped and aircraft crashed with total loss, pilot survived.

March 1, 1915 was the scheduled date for a heavy attack on the rebels. The mission was to fly over the Valley of Santa Maria, to launch bombs on the rebels' stronghold, and to observe and direct the shots of the artillery and the advance of the infantry. Two Morane-Saulnier aircraft took off, but the attack was canceled due to adverse weather conditions, for the aircraft piloted by then lieutenant-aviator Ricardo Kirk suffered a crash, of which he was killed.

Ricardo Kirk was the first Brazilian Military Aviator. In 1891 he entered the Military Academy and was commissioned an ensign in November, 1893 and to first-lieutenant in March, 1898 and posthumously to captain in 1915.

Air actions of the Constitutionalist Revolution

Although the two sides in struggle had few airplanes during the Constitutionalist Revolution of 1932, aviation made a big impact during the conflict. The federal government had approximately 58 aircraft divided between the Navy and the Army.

On the other hand, the Paulistas had only two Potez 25 and two Waco planes, in addition to a small number of tourist planes. At the end of July, the rebel government obtained another plane, brought by Lieutenant Artur Mota Lima, who defected from Campo dos Afonsos, Rio de Janeiro. The "reds", as the federal government planes were known, not only acted on the lines of combat, but also were used to bombard several cities of São Paulo, among them Campinas, where they caused great damage. They also served as a propaganda weapon, dropping leaflets on enemy cities and into rebel concentration camps.

For the use of aerial means, General Góis Monteiro had in his Staff of two advisers, Captains Vasco Alves Secco and Carlos Pfaltzgraff Brazil.

Major Eduardo Gomes, commander of the Joint Aviation Group, who since the outbreak of hostilities had coordinated the employment of his unit and the reinforcements of the Military Aviation School, was designated, on September 16, Commander of the Air Units of the Army Detachment of the East.

On September 6, Major Ajalmar Vieira Mascarenhas was appointed Commander of the Air Units of the Detachment of the Southern Army.

The Navy's aircraft were under the direct operational control of the naval authorities, operating in support of the surface ships deployed near the port of Santos, to effect a naval blockade and also in support of the Naval Flotilla of Mato Grosso, based in Ladário. They also participated in operations with Military Aviation in the Paraíba Valley and on the southern front, in escort and observation missions.

The Air Force of São Paulo was under the overall command of Major Ivo Borges, Commander of the Aviation Units of the Constitutionalist Aviation, and Major Lysias A. Rodrigues, Commander of the Constitutionalist Aviation Group.

Establishment

The establishment of the United Kingdom's Royal Air Force in April 1918, and the creation of the Italian Air Force (Regia Aeronautica) and the French Air Force during the 1920s drove the idea of uniting Brazilian air power under the same organization. Together with these events the Brazilian strategists were also influenced by the theories of Giulio Douhet, Billy Mitchell and Hugh Montague Trenchard.

The first public manifest to create an integrated military air service came up in 1928 when an army Major called Lysias Rodrigues wrote an article called "An urgent need: The Ministry of the Air". Two years later the French Military Mission, working for the Brazilian Army, made the first steps to organize a national air arm. The idea got more support when a group of Brazilian airmen came from Italy in 1934 and explained the advantages of having a military aviation unified. Also, the Spanish Revolution and the first movements of World War II at the end of the thirties showed the importance of Air power for military strategies.

One of the main supporters of the plan to create an independent air arm was the then-president Getúlio Vargas. He organized a study group early in 1940 and the whole structure of the Ministry of Aeronautics was established the end of that year.  This new governmental agency was responsible for the all aspects of the civil and military aviation including infrastructure, regulation and organization.

Formally, the Ministry of Aeronautics was founded on January 20, 1941, and so its military branch called "National Air Forces", changed to "Brazilian Air Force" on May, 22. The Army and Navy air branches were extinguished and all personnel, aircraft, installations and other related equipment were transferred to FAB.

World War II

The Brazilian Air force made important contributions to the Allied war effort in World War II, especially as part of the Brazilian Expeditionary Force on the Italian front.

From mid-1942 until the end of the war, the FAB also patrolled the Atlantic. Two Brazilian aircraft, a PBY Catalina and a Lockheed Hudson, and an American PBM Mariner attacked the U-boat. The Catalina, named , was captained by 2nd Lt. Alberto M. Torres, and hit U-199 with depth charges, sinking her. Forty-nine of the crew were killed, although twelve Germans managed to escape, including the captain. This was possible due to the Catalina's crew, who threw a lifeboat to the survivors.
"1st Fighter Group", which saw action in Italy, was formed on December 18, 1943. Its commanding officer was Aviation Lt.Col. Nero Moura.

The group had 350 men, including 43 pilots. The group was divided into four flights: Red ("A"), Yellow ("B"), Blue ("C"), and Green ("D"). The CO of the group and some officers were not attached to any specific flight.  Unlike the BEF's Army component, the 1º GAVCA had personnel who were experienced Brazilian Air Force pilots. One of them was Alberto M. Torres, who had piloted a PBY Catalina that had sunk U-199, operating off the Brazilian coast.

The group trained for combat in Panama, where 2º Ten.-Av. (Aviation Second Lieutenant) Dante Isidoro Gastaldoni was killed in a training accident. On May 11, 1944, the group was declared operational and became active in the air defense of the Panama Canal Zone.  On June 22, the 1º GAVCA traveled to the US to convert to the Republic P-47D Thunderbolt.

On September 19, 1944, the 1º GAVCA left for Italy, arriving at Livorno on October 6. It became part of the 350th Fighter Group of the USAAF, which in turn was part of the 62nd Fighter Wing, XXII Tactical Air Command, of the 12th Air Force.

The Brazilian pilots initially flew from 31 October 1944, as individual elements of flights attached to 350th FG squadrons, at first in affiliation flights and progressively taking part in more dangerous missions.  Less than two weeks later, on November 11, the group started its own operations flying from its base at Tarquinia, using its tactical callsign Jambock. Brazilian Air Force stars replaced the white U.S. star in the roundel on the FAB Thunderbolts. The 1oGAVCA started its fighting career as a fighter-bomber unit, its missions being armed reconnaissance and interdiction, in support of the US Fifth Army, to which the FEB was attached.
On April 16, 1945, the U.S. Fifth Army started its offensive along the Po Valley. By then, the strength of the Group had fallen to 25 pilots, some having been killed and others shot down and captured. Some others had been relieved from operations on medical grounds due to combat fatigue. The Group disbanded the Yellow flight and distributed the surviving pilots among the other flights. Each pilot flew on average two missions a day.

On 22 April 1945, the three remaining flights took off at 5-minute intervals, starting at 8:30 AM, to destroy bridges, barges, and motorized vehicles in the San Benedetto region.  At 10:00 AM, a flight took off for an armed reconnaissance mission south of Mantua. They destroyed more than 80 tanks, trucks, and vehicles. By the end of the day, the group had flown 44 individual missions and destroyed hundreds of vehicles and barges. On this day the group flew the most sorties of the war; consequently, Brazil commemorates April 22 Brazilian Fighter Arm Day.

In all, the 1oGAVCA flew a total of 445 missions, 2,550 individual sorties, and 5,465 combat flight hours, from 11 November 1944 to 6 May 1945.  The XXII Tactical Air Command acknowledged the efficiency of the Group by noting that although it flew only 5% of the total of missions carried out by all squadrons under its control, it accomplished a much higher percentage of the total destruction wrought:
 85% of the ammunition depots
 36% of the fuel depots
 28% of the bridges (19% damaged)
 15% of motor vehicles (13% damaged)
 10% of horse-drawn vehicles (10% damaged)

Post World War II

After the war, the FAB began flying the British Gloster Meteor jet fighter. The jets were purchased from the British for 15,000 tons of crude cotton, as Brazil had no foreign currency reserves to spare.  The jet was operated by the FAB until the mid-1960s, when it was replaced by the F-80C and TF-33A, which were later replaced by the MB-326, Mirage III and Northrop F-5 jets.

During events involving the Lobster War, between 1961 and 1964, the Brazilian Air Force played an important role in monitoring and patrolling the large area of litigation with France, making its B-17 squadrons available for observation and photo-reconnaissance of French vessels close to Brazilian coast, in addition to using its most modern anti-submarine warfare means, such as the S-2 Tracker and P-2V Neptune.

Having been given authority over all national military aircraft since 1941, from her commissioning in 1961 to 1999 the Brazilian Air Force flew the S-2 Trackers of the aircraft carrier Minas Gerais while from 1965 naval aviation flew its own helicopters.  Now naval aviation is also authorized to fly its own fixed wing carrier based aircraft.

Cold War

During the Cold War, the then Brazilian military government was aligned with the United States and NATO. This meant that the Northrop F-5 could be bought cheaply from the United States, which called this jet the "Freedom Fighter". Many other countries, such as Mexico, also benefited from this policy. But Brazil did not buy the F-5A Freedom Fighter, instead buying the F-5 Tiger II years later.

In the middle of the Cold War, between 1970 and 1974, the Brazilian Air Force used its attack aircraft to bomb camps of internal Maoism guerrilla groups in the regions of the Vale do Ribeira and in the Araguaia River, attacking targets inside the jungles, using NA T-6 attack planes and B-26 Invader bombers armed with napalms.

In 1977 the Brazilian Air Force conducted Operation Saucer regarding alleged UFO sightings in the city of Colares, Pará State. The objects observed in the military records received the nickname of luminous bodies and were associated with phenomena reported by residents and authorities, reported by the local press, which reported alleged attacks on the civilian population. The operation was terminated after 4 months, and other related missions were carried out during 1978 by the National Intelligence Service. The Operation's documentary collection comprises hundreds of pages of documents, such as reports, photographic images and footage.

On April 9, 1982, the Brazilian Air Force showed its ability to guarantee Brazilian sovereignty. In the midst of the Falklands War, on a rainy Good Friday night, the radar system detected a lyushin II-62M, registration number CU-T1225, Soviet-made and belonging to Cubana, a Cuban state company about 300 km away from Brasilia. Two F-103E Mirage III fighters from the 1st Air Defense Group (1st GDA), based at Anápolis Air Base, took off at around 9:00 pm to carry out the mission to protect Brazilian airspace. Under the guidance of the ground control, the two F-103Es positioned themselves next to the Cuban invader. It was then that, from the Military Operations Center, Major José Orlando Bellon said on the radio, in English: “You were intercepted. There are two combat aircraft at your side. The order is to land in Brasilia immediately ”. Under the surveillance of Brazilian hunters, they made a landing at Brasilia International Airport at 10:12 pm.

On June 3, 1982, two F-5E Tiger II fighters from the 1st Fighter Aviation Group, based at the Santa Cruz Air Force Base - Rio de Janeiro, intercepted an Avro Vulcan Royal Air Force that had technical problems when returning from a mission during the Falklands War in the South Atlantic Ocean off the coast of Rio de Janeiro. The aircraft was temporarily detained in Brazil.

The Embraer (Brazilian Aeronautic Co.) company has its origins as an enterprise directly managed and sponsored by the FAB. Working with Italian corporations, it developed the new AMX attack aircraft (known locally as the A-1) which makes up the backbone of the FAB's attack force. The successful Tucano T-27 trainer and the new A-29 light attack aircraft are also Embraer types used extensively by the FAB.

During Operation Traira, in February 1991, six AT-27 Tucanos were used for close air support against a group of 40 rebels from the Revolutionary Armed Forces of Colombia), which had seized a Brazilian military detachment.

Post Cold War

In October, 2002, the Brazilian Air Force used its A-1 AMX fighter bombers to destroy clandestine airstrips used by the narcotics traffickers in the interior of the Amazon rainforest near the border with Suriname. The operation also had support from the Brazilian Army and Brazilian Federal Police with many drug dealers being arrested as a result. The AMX Bomber/Fighter was the primary plane used.

On November 21, 2008, F-5E Tiger II fighter jets from the 1st Fighter Aviation Group based at the Santa Cruz Air Force Base intercepted a civilian cargo Douglas DC-8 from a private company in Ghana as it entered the Brazilian airspace, off the coast of Cabo Frio, littoral of Rio de Janeiro. The aircraft was escorted by the Brazilian F-5s to the Galeão Air Force Base.

On 3 June 2009, two Brazilian Air Force A-29 Super Tucanos, guided by an Embraer R-99, intercepted a Cessna U206G engaged in drug trafficking activities. Inbound from Bolivia, the Cessna was intercepted in the region of Alta Floresta d'Oeste, and after exhausting all procedures, one of the Super Tucanos fired a warning shot from its 12.7 mm machine guns, after which the aircraft followed the Super Tucanos to Cacoal airport.

In 2010, the FAB worked on the Search & Rescue mission of Air France Flight 447.
The Brazilian Air Force has started a search and rescue from the Brazilian archipelago of Fernando de Noronha, sending eight planes to search a stretch bounded by the coastal cities of Recife, Natal and the archipelago of Fernando de Noronha.

On March 12, 2012, during the Operation Agata 4, the Brazilian Air Force used two A-29 Super Tucano to destroy a clandestine runway used by drug traffickers within the Amazon rainforest.

In 2011–2013, Operation Agatha marks the start of a new decade of the twenty-first century with the consolidation of the Amazon Surveillance System (SIVAM), an intricate network of radars, meteorological sensors, digital satellite communications, and advanced air-traffic-control software, among other technological advances available to Brazilian Military personnel. The Brazilian Air Force (FAB), which deployed new tactics and methods of fighting using RQ-450 remote-controlled aircraft. Operating in conjunction with sophisticated E-99 Guardian planes, they will locate objectives for A-29 Super Tucano fighters flying in darkness. Northrop F-5EM fighters, responsible for providing air superiority.
In July 2016, Defense Aerospace Brazilian command displays participation of Brazilian Air Force at the Olympic Games Rio 2016, there will be over 15,000 military and 80 aircraft involved in the Olympics. To defense missions and aerial patrol 32 fighters (Northrop F-5M and A-29 Super Tucano), for aerial warning missions 2 radar aircraft (Embraer R-99), surveillance missions 3 Unmanned aircraft (Hermes 450 and Hermes 900), for maritime patrol missions 1 (P-3 Orion), for logistical support missions (Boeing C-767, C-130 and C-295), 15 helicopters (Mil Mi-35, UH-60 Black Hawk and EC-725).

Between 2004 and 2017, the FAB worked on the United Nations Stabilization Mission in Haiti (MINUSTAH) supporting the United Nations force (a joint Brazilian, Uruguayan, Chilean and Argentine force) deployed there.

In November 2017, while searching for the missing Argentine Submarine ARA San Juan, the Brazilian Air Force sent a C-295M search and rescue aircraft and a P-3AM Orion anti-submarine warfare aircraft to assist in the international search effort.

In January 2021, in the middle of the second wave of the COVID-19 pandemic, the Brazilian city of Manaus, located in the interior of the amazon rainforest, was left with an overburdened medical service needing medical supplies and transferring patients, a major operation was set up by Brazilian air force, mobilizing all its available transport aviation, aircraft C-130, KC-390, C-97 Brasilia, C-95M Bandeirantes, CASA C-105 and C-99 were deployed for the largest aeromedical evacuation operation in Brazilian aviation military history.

Exercises

The Cruzex air force exercises are the most important of its type in South America. They are hosted every 2 years by the Brazilian Air Force.
Issues and participants:
 Cruzex I 2002: South Region – Argentina, Brazil, France, Chile – participation of 90 aircraft
 Cruzex II 2004: Northeast Region – Argentina, Brazil, France, Venezuela – participation of 92 aircraft
 Cruzex III 2006: Central-West Region – Argentina, Brazil, France, Chile, Uruguay, Venezuela – participation of 104 aircraft
 Cruzex IV 2008: Northeast Region – Brazil, Chile, France, Uruguay, Venezuela – participation of 100 aircraft
 Cruzex V 2010: Northeast Region – Brazil, Chile, France, Uruguay, United States – participation of 97 aircraft
 Cruzex VI 2012: Northeast Region – Argentina, Brazil, Canada, Chile, Ecuador, France, Peru, Uruguay, Venezuela, Sweden, United Kingdom, United States – personnel only, no aircraft
Cruzex Flight 2013: Northeast Region – Brazil, Canada, Colombia, Chile, Ecuador, Uruguay, Venezuela, United States – participation of 96 aircraft
Cruzex Flight 2018: Northeast Region – Brazil, Canada, Chile, France, Peru, Uruguay, United States – participation of 100 aircraft

Future of the Air Force

The Air Force has a large number of active and planned projects, under the modernization plans of the Brazilian Armed Forces, defined in the National Defense White Paper.

Inventory

Aircraft

Developments

In the early 2000s, with renewed economic stability, the FAB underwent an extensive renewal of its inventory through several acquisition programs, the most ambitious of which was the acquisition of 36 new front-line interceptor aircraft to replace its aging Mirage III. Known in the late 1990s as the F-X Project, the program was postponed during the presidential mandate of Fernando Henrique Cardoso, who in the end of 2002 left the decision for his successor Luís Inácio ‘Lula’ da Silva, who postponed it again in 2003 and 2004.  It was postponed indefinitely in 2005.

On July 15, 2005, one agreement was set with the French government for the transfer of twelve Dassault Mirage 2000s (ten "C" and two "B" versions) second-hand ex-Armée de L'Air. Known as F-2000s in Brazil, the first two aircraft arrived at Anápolis Air Base on September 4, 2006.

In 2007, Brazilian Air Force's Institute for Advanced Studies started the 14-X development, a hypersonic scramjet demonstrator envisaged to fly at 30 km of altitude at 3 km/s, corresponding to Mach number 10. In March 2012 a Mach 7 variation has been suggested, named as 14-X S.

On November 4, 2007, the F-X Project was restarted.  Known as Project F-X2 from the start of 2008, and with a bigger budget, the competitors for acquisition were the Eurofighter Typhoon, Sukhoi Su-35, Gripen NG, Dassault Rafale, Boeing F/A-18E/F Super Hornet and, although information on Lockheed Martin's F-35 Lightning II was requested, Lockheed Martin presented an F-16 Fighting Falcon variant (designated F-16BR). In October 2008, FAB released a shortlist of 3 aircraft: Saab Gripen NG, Dassault Rafale and Boeing F/A-18E/F Super Hornet. In February 2009, the three companies provided their final bids. In September 2009, following a surprise French visit to Brazil, Brazilian President Luiz Inácio Lula da Silva and Nicolas Sarkozy, from France, made a new military cooperation agreement. Lula, on an interview at TV5 Monde, said French Rafale was a step forward, as technology transfer would be effective.

On September 7, 2009, Brazilian Independence Day, it was announced Brazil would negotiate 36 Dassault Rafale. But the Defence Minister did not confirm the final decision.

On January 5, 2010, after lobbying by Air Force Officers and Commanders, it was reported that the final evaluation report by the Brazilian Air Force placed the Saab Gripen NG ahead of the other contenders. The decisive factor was apparently the overall cost of the new fighters, both in terms of unit cost, and operating and maintenance costs, and the personal preference of the test pilots. Rafale was reported not to be even the second choice. It was announced in February 2011 that the decision would be further delayed due to budget cuts. And that July the decision was put off for yet another six-month extension.

However, in 2013, yet another six-month delay was announced. In early June 2013, after a visit from US Vice President Joe Biden with Brazilian President Dilma Rousseff; Biden assured President Rousseff that the US Congress would approve technology transfer for Boeing's F-18s. In a move apparently following the NSA spying scandal, Russia has also offered Brazil a stake in the development of the Sukhoi PAK-FA 5th generation jet fighter with complete stealth technology transfer.

Saab won the competition on 18 December 2013. The change away from the American jet was due to the 2013 Global surveillance disclosure, according to Reuters reporting; other sources agree with the official rationale that the decision was due to cost and technological transfer.  As of January 2014, Brazil is in negotiations with Saab to lease current model Gripens while they wait four years for the next generation jets on order to be developed and built.

On July 28, 2015, the Brazilian government met with a Swedish trading commission to revisit the contract and request a low of 2.58% in interest rates to 1.98% per annum, generating a savings of 1 billion dollars in 25 years. Sweden rejected the application and signing the contract is seriously threatened with limit until October 2015.  On July 29, 2015, the Brazilian government confirmed that it had reached an agreement with Sweden to finance the purchase of a batch of 36 Gripen NG.

In September 2015 Brazil finalized the US$4.68 billion purchase of 36 Saab Gripen E fighters to be delivered between 2019 and 2024. An assembly line is being established in Brazil to build 15 of the aircraft with engineers and technicians from Brazil traveling to Sweden to begin training.  Saab officials have said they believe this is just an initial order, with potential for additional sales to other Latin American countries.

Helicopter aerial refueling

In November 2020 the Brazilian Air Force (FAB), through a technical and multidisciplinary team coordinated by the Department of Aerospace Science and Technology, concluded, on October 30, in Rio de Janeiro, the last phase of the inflight refueling tests campaign between the H-36 Caracal helicopter and the KC-130 Hercules aircraft.

The flights took place in a restricted area under military control, on the coast of Rio de Janeiro, where the refueling aircraft KC-130 Hercules of the Squadron Gordo ( “fat”, 1st / 1st GT) and H-36 Caracal helicopters from squadrons Falcão ( “Falcon” 1st / 8th GAV) and Puma (3rd / 8th GAV) met to perform the REVO procedure.

The Campaign aimed to complete the tasks foreseen in the certification process, including the unprecedented steps of transferring fuel from the KC-130 to the H-36 and the simultaneous refueling of two helicopters.

As a result, Brazil becomes the first country in South America with the ability to refuel helicopters in flight, a historic landmark for Brazilian Air Force and Brazil.

Datalink

The Link-BR2 is a datalink developed by the Air Force and the Brazilian defence company AEL Sistemas, this technology allow the exchange of data such radar information, videos and images with other units of the three branches anytime and anywhere, using an advanced encrypted protocol with a high degree of security.

Structure

The Brazilian Air Force is the aerospace branch of the Brazilian armed forces and is managed by the "Aeronautics Command". The COMAER was created in 1999 and is assigned as service branch of the Armed Forces as part of the Ministry of Defense.

The COMAER is the department of the Air Force, the successor of the former Ministry of Aeronautics, when it was absorbed into the Ministry of Defence. The department is led by the "Aeronautics Commander". The Commander is the most senior Air Force rank, is appointed by the President, and reports directly to the Minister of Defense. The COMAER includes the Air Force Staff (Estado-Maior da Aeronáutica (EMAER)). The COMAER is in charge of seven major organization bodies, which comprise the FAB.

Readiness Command (Comando de Preparo (COMPREP)) is the successor of the former General Command of Air Operations. It is headquartered in Brasília, DF and commands most of the air force's flying units, responsible for their operational training and readiness.

Aerospace Operations Command (Comando de Operações Aeroespaciais (COMAE)) succeeded the Brazilian Aerospace Defence Command (Comando de Defesa Aeroespacial Brasileiro (COMDABRA)), also headquartered in Brasília, DF. It is responsible for the constant surveillance and security of the country's aerospace and takes over operational command of the COMPREP's units.

General Command for Support (Comando-Geral de Apoio (COMGAP)) is in charge of aircraft and infrastructure maintenance and logistics. It is headquartered in São Paulo, SP.

General Command for Personnel (Comando-Geral de Pessoal (COMGEP)) is in charge of personnel development, training, medicine and documentation. HQ is in Brasília, DF.

Aerospace Control Department (Departamento de Controle do Espaço Aéreo (DECEA)) is in charge of air defence, air traffic control (both civil and military), control and communications, meteorology, cartography and enforcement of civil air traffic regulations. HQ is at Rio de Janeiro - Santos Dumont IAP, RJ.

Science and Aerospace Technology Department (Departamento de Ciência e Tecnologia Aeroespacial (DCTA)) is in charge of technology development, project management and industry relations with the private sector. HQ is at São José dos Campos IAP, SP.

Economy, Finance and Administration Secretariate (Secretaria de Economia, Finanças e Administração da Aeronáutica (SEFA)) is headquartered in Brasília, DF.

There are also seven "Regional Air Commands". The four former operational air forces were specialised into advanced flying training (I. Air Force), maritime patrol and helicopters (II. Air Force), combat aviation (III. Air Force) and air transport (V. Air Force). The seven regional air force commands were specialised into land-based operational support, air force infrastructure maintenance and support to the civilian population. Each region had a single air transport squadron as its only flying unit. Beginning 2016, the Air Force's flying operations were merged into the Air Force Readiness Command (AFRC), which was organized into 12 wings and the 1st Air Defense Brigade. The four air forces were disbanded and their flying squadrons were re-assigned to the air bases, which in turn were subordinated to the air force regions, giving them operational tasks.

Air units organization

At unit levels, "Groups" usually consist of one to sixteen consecutively numbered "Squadrons", each with varying numbers of aircraft, usually from six to 12. Smaller formations are known as "Flights". According to its tasks, a group has one of the following designations:
 Air Defense Group: : Air defense fighters. (Fighter Jets)
 Transport Group: : Transport, Flight refueling
 Aviation Group: : Fighter, attack, reconnaissance, SAR, rotary wing
 Fighter Aviation Group: : Fighter, attack planes
 Troop Transport Group: : Transports, troop carrying, parachutist drop
 Special Flight Inspection Group: : Calibration
 Special Test Flights Group: : Test flights
 Special Transport Group: : VIP transport
Common used designations for squadrons are:
 Air Transport Squadron: 
 Air Training Squadron: 
 Demonstration flying team:  (also called )

The Military Units of the Brazilian Air Force are:

Airspace Control Department 
Air Traffic Control in Brazil is militarised and under the Air Force. This is a legacy from the time when each of the three armed serviced was under its own government ministry and the corresponding Ministério da Aeronáutica (MAER) was in charge of both the FAB and civil aviation. The Airspace Control Department (Departamento de Controle do Espaço Aéreo (DECEA)) was established in 1942 and due to the civil-military character of the former Ministry of Aeronautics it developed into a heterogenous service tasked with air force communications, operations command and control, civil air traffic control, aerial navigation systems calibration and meteorology, even including a disciplinary council for violations of airspace directives.

Airspace Control Department (Departamento de Controle do Espaço Aéreo (DECEA)) - Rio de Janeiro - Santos Dumont Airport, RJ (co-located with the 3rd Air Force Region Command)

 Airspace Control System Implementation Committee (Comissão de Implantação do Sistema de Controle do Espaço Aéreo (CISCEA)) - Rio de Janeiro - Santos Dumont Airport, RJ
 Air Movement Management Center (Centro de Gerenciamento da Navegação Aérea (CGNA)) - Rio de Janeiro - Santos Dumont Airport, RJ
 1st Integrated Air Defence and Air Traffic Control Center (1º Centro Integrado de Defesa Aérea e Controle de Tráfego Aéreo (CINDACTA I)) - Brasília Air Force Base, DF (co-located with the Air Force Readiness Command (COMPREP))
 2nd Integrated Air Defence and Air Traffic Control Center (2º Centro Integrado de Defesa Aérea e Controle de Tráfego Aéreo (CINDACTA II)) - Bacacheri Airport, Curitiba ,PR
 3rd Integrated Air Defence and Air Traffic Control Center (3º Centro Integrado de Defesa Aérea e Controle de Tráfego Aéreo (CINDACTA III)) - Recife Air Force Base, PE
 4th Integrated Air Defence and Air Traffic Control Center (4º Centro Integrado de Defesa Aérea e Controle de Tráfego Aéreo (CINDACTA IV)) - Manaus, AM
 Southeast Regional Airspace Control Center (Centro Regional de Controle do Espaço Aéreo Sudeste (CRCEA-SE)) - São Paulo–Congonhas Airport, SP - responsible for the cluster of the country's busiest airports in the Rio de Janeiro - São Paulo area.
 Brazilian Aeronautical Technical [Support] Mission in Bolivia (Missão Técnica Aeronáutica Brasileira na Bolívia (MTAB-Bolívia)) - Jorge Wilstermann IAP, Cochabamba, Bolivia - providing technical assistance for the implementation of a CINDACTA-type integrated system for the whole Bolivian airspace.
 1st Communications and Control Group (1º Grupo de Comunicações e Controle (1º GCC)) - Galeão Air Force Base, Rio de Janeiro, RJ
 1st Communications Squadron (1º Esquadrão de Comunicação (1º/1º GCC)) - Santa Cruz Air Force Base, Rio de Janeiro, RJ - the Air Force's main communication hub.
 2nd Early Warning, Command and Control Squadron (2º Esquadrão de Controle e Alarme (2º/1º GCC)) - Canoas Air Force Base, Canoas, RS
 4th Early Warning, Command and Control Squadron (4º Esquadrão de Controle e Alarme (4º/1º GCC)) - Santa Maria Air Force Base, Santa Maria, RS
 3rd Control Squadron (3º Esquadrão de Controle (3º/1º GCC)) - Natal Air Force Base, Natal, RN - equipped with terminal and precision approach radars.
 5th Control Squadron (5º Esquadrão de Controle (5º/1º GCC)) - Porto Velho Air Force Base, Porto Velho, RO - equipped with terminal and precision approach radars.
 Air Force Electronic Materiel Park Rio de Janeiro (Parque de Material de Eletrônica da Aeronáutica do Rio de Janeiro (PAME-RJ)) - Rio de Janeiro, RJ - maintenance facility for ground radar equipment.
 Airspace Control Institute (Instituto de Controle do Espaço Aéreo (ICEA)) - São José dos Campos IAP, SP - training institute for air traffic control personnel.
 Integrated Center for Aeronautics Meteorology (Centro Integrado de Meteorologia Aeronáutica (CIMAER)) - Galeão Air Force Base, Rio de Janeiro, RJ
 Air Force Institute for Cartography (Instituto de Cartografia da Aeronáutica (ICA)) - Rio de Janeiro - Santos Dumont Airport, RJ
 Disciplinary Council of Aeronautics (Junta de Julgamento da Aeronáutica (JJAer)) - Rio de Janeiro - Santos Dumont Airport, RJ
 Special Air Group for Flight Control Systems Inspection (Grupo Especial de Inspeção em Voo (GEIV)) - Rio de Janeiro - Santos Dumont Airport, RJ - the Department's sole flying unit, operating specially-modified Embraer Legacy 500 flight laboratory aircraft.

Brazilian Air Force Infantry
The Infantry Battalions are composed of Air Force Police Companies, Air Force Infantry Companies, Firefighting Companies and Quick Reaction Companies, in addition, they are organized into:

 Battalion Staff
 Battalion Band
 Ceremonial Units
 Supply and Logistics
 Enlisted Training Section
 Mobilization and National Service
 Infantry Training and Formation

Units of the Esquadrão Aeroterrestre de Salvamento, known as Para-SAR, although it is operationally subordinated to the Readiness Command's 5th Wing, are also part of the Air Force Infantry.

Destined to the protection of the air force bases and other terrestrial installation, the air defense forces also manned by the Air Force Infantry. At FAB, there are three groups, each stationed in the air bases in Canoas, Manaus and Anápolis.

The Fire Fighting Service, whether be in the Air Force Command or in air bases, is responsible for maintaining the safety of the various military airfields, shared or not, as well as the buildings of interest of this command. Follows international standards of protection to the flight, having like the Central Organ of its management, the Direction of Aeronautical Engineering. The military and civilians belonging to this sector are properly qualified professionals and have the need to be continuously alert for the prompt attendance of aeronautical emergencies, which according to ICAO rules have only 3 minutes to attend an aeronautical emergency that occurs in the area Of the aerodrome.

Formed in 1941 with the formation of the Air Force the Air Force Infantry is organized on a regional basis with units stationed in air bases all over Brazil.

Airborne Rescue Squadron (PARA-SAR)

The Esquadrão Aeroterrestre de Salvamento (EAS) (English: Airborne Rescue Squadron), known by its nickname Para-SAR, is a Brazilian Air Force airborne search and rescue squadron, based in the city of Rio de Janeiro. The unit has seven SAR teams located in seven states. Each Para-SAR detachment is made up of SAR qualified military parachutists. Members of this unit can be distinguished by their maroon berets and orange baseball caps.

The Brazilian Air Force has a long history of parachute training. In 1943, at the former Alfonsos Field School of Aeronautics and with the support of the Air Force, cadet gymnastics instructor Achile Garcia Charles Astor first introduced civil parachute training in Brazil.

Seeing the usefulness of having a parachuting unit, the Electronics and Flight Protection Administration conducted studies to see how such a unit could be created under the auspices of the air force. The results of that study gave rise to the Para-SAR.

In 1946, the Brazilian Army formed its parachute school, the now-named General Penha Brazil Parachutist's Instruction Center. It graduated its first class of Brazilian Air Force students in 1959.

See also
 Academia da Força Aérea
 Aerial Demonstration Squadron
 Alberto Torres
 Brazil and weapons of mass destruction
 Brazilian Army
 Brazilian Army Aviation Command
 Brazilian Naval Aviation
 Brazilian Navy
 Military history of Brazil
 Military ranks of Brazil
 Rui Moreira Lima

References

Bibliography

External links

 Brazilian Air Force website 
 Brazilian Air Force page at Scramble
 History of Brazilian Air Force in World War II 
 History of the Brazilian Air Force 
 Milavia – Brazilian Air Force
 Military orders and medals from Brazil 

 
Military units and formations established in 1941